Niger participated at the 2018 Summer Youth Olympics in Buenos Aires, Argentina from 6 October to 18 October 2018.

Medalists
 Mahamadou Amadou – Taekwondo, boys' 55 kg

Athletics

Swimming

Taekwondo

References

2018 in Nigerian sport
Nations at the 2018 Summer Youth Olympics
Niger at the Youth Olympics